Robin Haase was the defending champion but chose not to participate.

Thiago Monteiro won the title, defeating Carlos Berlocq 4–6, 6–4, 6–1 in the final.

Seeds

Draw

Finals

Top half

Bottom half

References
Main Draw
Qualifying Draw

Open du Pays d'Aix - Singles
Open du Pays d'Aix